Henry Richard Duden, Jr.  (November 24, 1924 – March 31, 2013) was an American football end in the National Football League (NFL) for the New York Giants.  He was inducted into the College Football Hall of Fame in 2001 after a stellar college football career at the United States Naval Academy.

Duden died at his home on March 31, 2013, at the age of 88.

References

1924 births
2013 deaths
All-American college football players
People from Pottstown, Pennsylvania
American football wide receivers
Navy Midshipmen football players
New York Giants players
College Football Hall of Fame inductees
Players of American football from Pennsylvania
Sportspeople from Montgomery County, Pennsylvania
People from Severna Park, Maryland
Military personnel from Pennsylvania